Thomas Haney Berry (December 31, 1842 – June 6, 1915) was a professional baseball player who played for the Philadelphia Athletics in one game during the 1871 season. He had one hit in four at-bats in that game.

Berry was a soldier in the Union Army from 1862 to 1865 during the American Civil War. He served in Company B of Sixteenth Regiment of the Pennsylvania Volunteers, Company A of the Thirty-Seventh Regiment of Pennsylvania Volunteers and Company A of the Nineteenth Regiment. He died in 1915 in his home town of Chester, Pennsylvania of tuberculosis.

References

Sources

1842 births
1915 deaths
Major League Baseball right fielders
Philadelphia Athletics (NABBP) players
Philadelphia Athletics (NA) players
Baseball players from Pennsylvania
19th-century baseball players
Sportspeople from Chester, Pennsylvania
20th-century deaths from tuberculosis
Tuberculosis deaths in Pennsylvania
Union Army soldiers